Ross Donald King is a Professor of Machine Intelligence at Chalmers University of Technology.

Education
King completed a Bachelor of Science degree in Microbiology at the University of Aberdeen in 1983 and went on to study for a Master of Science degree in Computer Science at the University of Newcastle in 1985. Following this, he completed a PhD at The Turing Institute at the University of Strathclyde in 1989 for work on developing machine learning methods for protein structure prediction.

Research
King's research interests are in the automation of science, drug design, AI, machine learning and synthetic biology. He is probably best known for the Robot Scientist project which has created a robot that can:
 hypothesize to explain observations
 devise experiments to test these hypotheses
 physically run the experiments using laboratory robotics
 interpret the results from the experiments
 repeat the cycle as required

The Robot Scientist can autonomously execute high-throughput hypothesis led research. In addition to automating experimentation Robot Scientists are well suited to recording scientific knowledge: as the experiments are conceived and executed automatically by computer, it is possible to completely capture and digitally curate all aspects of the scientific process. Robot Scientist is the first machine to have been demonstrated to have discovered novel scientific knowledge. A new Robot Scientist Eve is designed to automate drug discovery. Eve automates high-throughput screening, hit confirmation, and lead generation through QSAR learning and testing.  Eve is being applied to the discovery of lead compounds for neglected tropical diseases.

King's research has been funded by the EPSRC and the BBSRC., European Union, HEFCW, the Royal Academy of Engineering and JISC. He worked at Aberystwyth University for 15 years then moved to Manchester in January 2012. He left the School of Computer Science at the University of Manchester in 2019 and moved to Chalmers University of Technology.

He has an h-index of 54 according to Google Scholar.

Collaborations
In 2000 King was a founder of the spin-out company PharmaDM, which developed data mining tools for the pharmaceutical industry. The company was based largely on research applying data mining to bioinformatics and chemoinformatics. The other scientific founders come from the University of Oxford and Leuven.

King has also developed an algorithm for converting protein coding DNA sequences into music with Colin Angus of The Shamen. The song S2-translation based on this is in the Rough Guide to Rock, and was on an album that sold more than 100,000 copies.

External links
 Ross D. King on VideoLectures.net

References

Year of birth missing (living people)
Living people
Alumni of the University of Aberdeen
Alumni of Newcastle University
Alumni of the University of Strathclyde
Academics of the University of Manchester
Academics of Aberystwyth University
People associated with the Department of Computer Science, University of Manchester
Academic staff of the Chalmers University of Technology